"2 + 2 = 5" is a song by the English rock band Radiohead, released as the third and final single from their sixth studio album, Hail to the Thief (2003). It reached number two on the Canadian Singles Chart, number 12 on the Italian Singles Chart, and number 15 on the UK Singles Chart. It was included in Radiohead: The Best Of (2008).

Recording 
"2 + 2 = 5" is a rock song that builds to a loud climax. It was recorded in 2002 at Ocean Way Recording studios in Hollywood, Los Angeles, with the producer Nigel Godrich. It was recorded as a studio test and finished in two hours.

Title 
The title is a reference to the slogan "two plus two equals five" from the 1949 dystopian novel Nineteen Eighty-Four by George Orwell. The song's alternative title, "The Lukewarm", references Dante's Inferno, in which the "lukewarm" are those in hell who did nothing wrong but did not oppose wrongdoing.

Track listings
UK CD1 (CDR 6623)
 "2 + 2 = 5" – 3:21
 "Remyxomatosis" (Cristian Vogel RMX) – 5:07
 "There There" (first demo) – 7:43

UK CD2 (CDRS 6623)
 "2 + 2 = 5" – 3:21
 "Skttrbrain" (Four Tet remix) – 4:26
 "I Will" (Los Angeles version) – 2:14

UK DVD single (DVDR 6623)
 "2 + 2 = 5" – 3:21
 "Sit Down Stand Up" (Ed Holdsworth's video)
 "The Most Gigantic Lying Mouth of All Time" (excerpt)

Personnel
Radiohead
Thom Yorke
Jonny Greenwood
Colin Greenwood
Ed O'Brien
Philip Selway
Additional personnel
Nigel Godrich – production
Darrell Thorp – engineering
Stanley Donwood – artwork

Charts

Release history

See also
 Com Lag (2plus2isfive) EP (2004)

References

External links
 AtEaseWeb.com page

2003 singles
Parlophone singles
Radiohead songs
Music based on Nineteen Eighty-Four
Song recordings produced by Nigel Godrich
Songs written by Thom Yorke
Songs written by Colin Greenwood
Songs written by Jonny Greenwood
Songs written by Philip Selway
Songs written by Ed O'Brien